A number of  bundled applications are delivered with purchased versions of the operating system. Some are provided in ROM or pre-installed on hard disk or equivalent, with others being supplied on removable media such as SD card.

Such applications vary between versions.


RISC OS bundled applications

Typically bundled with the OS

Bundled with specific hardware, including optional software packs

References 

RISC OS software
RISC OS bundled applications